Weskoppies is a public psychiatric hospital in Pretoria, Gauteng.  It is situated to the west of the city centre and was built on the site of the old botanical gardens.

The hospital is used by the University of Pretoria and the Sefako Makgatho Health Sciences University, and others, as a teaching hospital.

History
In 1892 the first psychiatric institution in the Zuid-Afrikaansche Republiek, the Krankzinnigengesticht te Pretoria (Pretoria Lunatic Asylum), was established in 1892, later being renamed as the Weskoppies Hospital.

References

External links

 ABLEWIKI Article

Psychiatric hospitals in South Africa
Hospitals in Gauteng
Buildings and structures in Pretoria
University of Pretoria buildings
Teaching hospitals in South Africa
University of Pretoria
1892 establishments in South Africa
University and college buildings completed in 1892
19th-century architecture in South Africa